Prabhu Tare Pagathiye is the first audio album of Omkar Dave and Mauli Dave.

This CD contains most of the Bhajans in Gujarati with one Bhajan in Hindi. The CD starts with Shloka for Lord Shiva and ends with "Vaishnavajan To Tene Re Kahiye" the well known Bhajan by Narasinh Mehta.

The music has been composed by Omkar. Music arrangement is also by Omkar. Mauli, Omkar, and Hemant have provided the vocals. The chorus is provided by Sanvari, Jalaj, and Kajari. The producer is Dipti Dave.

The audio CD was recorded in June, 2006 at Mrudang Studio, Ahmedabad and published in September 2006.

Track listing
 Shiv Stuti
 Khap Khap MaakhaN Chor
 Karjo Karjo Naiyaa Paar
 Jay Raghunandan Jay Siyaaraam
 Prabhu Taare Pagathiye
 Kaanji Taari Maa
 O Bhai
 Raamdoot Shri Jay Hanumaan
 Bhaj Govind
 VaishNavjan To

2006 albums